Nowshahr (also Romanized as Now Shahr, Noshahr, and Nau Shahr; also known as Bandar-e Noshahr and the former name was Dehno) is a city and capital of Nowshahr County, Mazandaran Province, Iran. The largest ethnic group in Nowshahr is Mazandarani people. People of Nowshahr speak the Kojuri dialect of the Mazanderani language. They are also fluent in Persian, the official language of Iran. 
It is a port city, located on the southern coast of the Caspian Sea. This city was the center of Ruyan (Tabaristan).

Climate and tourism 
Nowshahr has a humid subtropical climate (Köppen: Cfa, Trewartha: Cf), with warm, humid summers and cool, damp winters.

With its humid, subtropical climate, sea bathing in the waters of the Caspian, and the natural environment of its mountains, Nowshahr has long been a destination for domestic tourism in Iran. It attracts visitors by the hundreds of thousands every year to its hotels and private villas, by virtue of its transport links with the other cities of Northern Iran. During the reign of Mohammad Reza Shah Pahlavi Nowshahr was known unofficially as the 'second capital' or 'summer capital' of Iran because it was the city in which the Shah and most high-level government officials chose to live and work during the summer months.

History 

Nowshahr is part of kojur area and kojur is part of Ruyan.

Ruyan is a land in the west of Mazandaran Province, Iran. This land includes Kojur, Kalārestāq and Tonekabon.

The city of Kojur was the centre of the land of the Ruyans. Ruyan has always been part of the Tabaristan, nowadays called Mazandaran province. The Ruyan was also called the Rostamdār, Ostandār and Rostamdele.

Culture and industry
Noshahr Airport, previously an army airbase and currently a civilian-only airport is located on the western part of the city. The city is also home to Imam Khomeini University for Naval Sciences, some branches and campuses of Azad University of Noshahr and Chaloos, and Royan Institute of Higher Education. The Dual-use port of Noshahr was built by a Dutch contracting firm in late 1920s and is one of the most active ports of Iran in the Caspian Sea. The city of Chaloos and its associated towns and villages were part of the Noshahr township prior to 1996 after which they formed the new township of Chaloos by legislation from the national parliament. The city has been slow to industrialize due to environmental considerations and having an already vibrant economy based on Tourism, Ship transport and Agriculture, nevertheless there are local Food processing, Timber Treatment and Steel industries. Recently, a trailer assembly plant has opened in cooperation with the MAZ of Belarus.

Sports and leisure
Noshahr was home the Shamoushak who competed in the Persian Gulf Pro League from 2003 to 2006. Shamoushak folded its football team in 2013.

Notable people

 Pooran Farrokhzad (b. 1933) – poet
 Mohammad Rouyanian (b. 1960) – member of IRGC
 Mohsen Ashouri (b. 1965) – football player
 Parviz Shiva (b. 1963) – Businessman 
 Reza Sheykholeslam (b. 1967) – politician
 Kianoush Rahmati (b. 1978) – football player
 Rahman Ahmadi (b. 1980) – football player
 Hassan Rangraz (b. 1980) – wrestler
 Bahman Tahmasebi (b. 1980) – football player
 Esmaeil Bale (b. 1985) – football player
 Meysam Hosseini (b. 1987) – football player

References

External links

 Tabarestan Nowshahr Language Institutes آموزشگاه بزرگ زبان طبرستان نوشهر

Cities in Mazandaran Province

Populated coastal places in Iran
Populated places on the Caspian Sea
Port cities and towns in Iran
Port cities and towns of the Caspian Sea